Pedro Sarmiento, 3rd Marquis of Mancera and Count of Gondomar, Grandee of Spain  (c. 1625 – 1715) was a Spanish nobleman.

He was the son of Don Diego Sarmiento de Acuña, 2nd Count of Gondomar and of Francisca María de Toledo.

Descendants
In 1482, the Count married Teresa de Toledo, daughter of García Álvarez de Toledo, 1st Duke of Alba, with whom he had seven children. He married for a second time with María de Cabrera y Bobadilla, daughter of Andrés de Cabrera, 1st Marquis of Moya, with whom he had one more child.

By Teresa de Toledo:
 García Fernández Manrique, 3rd Count of Osorno (1483–1546)
 Gabriel Manrique
 Pedro Manrique
 Juan Manrique
 Aldonza Manrique
 María Manrique
 Beatriz Manrique

By María de Cabrera:
 Pedro Manrique de Bobadilla

Ancestry

Additional information

Notes

Sources

1620s births
1710s deaths
Pedro 03
Pedro 03
Grandees of Spain